Edward Percival Hordern (24 November 1884 – 10 October 1967) was an Australian rules footballer who played with Melbourne in the Victorian Football League (VFL).

Notes

External links 

Percy Hordern at Demonwiki

1884 births
Australian rules footballers from Melbourne
Melbourne Football Club players
1967 deaths
People from North Melbourne